Kalyanbati  is a village in Chanditala I community development block of Srirampore subdivision in Hooghly district in the Indian state of West Bengal.

Geography
Kalyanbati is located at:

Gram panchayat
Villages in Ainya gram panchayat are: Akuni, Aniya, Bandpur, Banipur, Bara Choughara, Dudhkanra, Ganeshpur, Goplapur, Jiara, Kalyanbati, Mukundapur, Sadpur and Shyamsundarpur.

Demographics
As per 2011 Census of India Kalyanbati had a total population of 1,217 of which 641 (53%) were males and 576 (47%) were females. Population below 6 years was 138. The total number of literates in Kalyanbati was 906 (83.97% of the population over 6 years).

Transport
Bargachia railway station and Baruipara railway station are the nearest railway stations.

References 

Villages in Chanditala I CD Block